Nadzeya Shushko is a Belarusian freestyle wrestler. She represented Belarus at the 2015 European Games held in Baku, Azerbaijan and she won one of the bronze medals in the 53 kg event.

Career 

In 2014, she competed in the women's freestyle 53 kg event at the World Wrestling Championships held in Tashkent, Uzbekistan.

She also competed in the women's freestyle 53 kg event at the 2015 World Wrestling Championships held in Las Vegas, United States.

Major results

References

External links 
 

Living people
Year of birth missing (living people)
Place of birth missing (living people)
Belarusian female sport wrestlers
European Games medalists in wrestling
European Games bronze medalists for Belarus
Wrestlers at the 2015 European Games
21st-century Belarusian women